Nanceen Lavern Perry (born April 19, 1977 in Fairfield, Texas) is a former sprinter from the United States.

She competed in the 4x100 meters relay in Sydney 2000, but her bronze medal was stripped after confessions of steroid doping by teammate Marion Jones.  Seven relay teammates successfully appealed the IOC decision, and the medals were restored in July, 2010.  Nanceen Perry did not participate in the appeal.  Nonetheless, the overturn of the IOC decision restored Perry's bronze medal.  Perry also ran in the 200 meters, but finished last in her semi-final round race.

Perry ran for the University of Texas, where she holds the school record in the 200 meters.  She was the 2000 American Indoor champion in the event.

She was inducted into the Longhorn Hall of Fame in 2009.

Personal bests
100 metres - 11.15 s (1999)
200 metres - 22.38 s (2000)

References

External links

1977 births
Living people
American female sprinters
Athletes (track and field) at the 2000 Summer Olympics
Medalists at the 2000 Summer Olympics
Olympic bronze medalists for the United States in track and field
World Athletics record holders (relay)
Universiade medalists in athletics (track and field)
People from Fairfield, Texas
Universiade gold medalists for the United States
Universiade bronze medalists for the United States
Medalists at the 1999 Summer Universiade
Olympic female sprinters
21st-century American women